Stradivari is a 1988 Italian biographical drama film directed by Giacomo Battiato. It depicts real life events of luthier Antonio Stradivari. It was filmed in sixteen weeks between Cremona (Stradivari's hometown) and Cinecittà. It stars Anthony Quinn along with his three sons by Italian costume designer, Iolanda Addolori.

Cast
 Anthony Quinn as Antonio Stradivari
 Stefania Sandrelli as Antonia Maria
 Valérie Kaprisky as Francesca
 Francesco Quinn as Alessandro
 Danny Quinn as Francesco
 Lorenzo Quinn as Young Antonio Stradivari 
 Leopoldo Trieste as Nicolò Amati 
 Pietro Tordi as Friar Mendicant 
 Iaia Forte as Comedienne on Boat

References

External links
 

1988 films
Italian biographical films
1980s Italian-language films
Films directed by Giacomo Battiato
1980s biographical drama films
Films set in the 17th century
Films set in the 18th century
Films shot at Cinecittà Studios
1988 drama films
Films about composers
Films about classical music and musicians
Biographical films about musicians
Cultural depictions of Italian men
1980s Italian films